Silvertip Mountain is a  summit in the Canadian Cascades south of Hope, British Columbia. It lies on the northern boundary of Skagit Valley Provincial Park. The mountain's toponym was officially adopted on December 2, 1948, by the Geographical Names Board of Canada. The peak was first climbed in 1908 by a Boundary Survey party.

Geology

Silvertip Mountain is related to the Chilliwack batholith, which intruded the region 26 to 29 million years ago after the major orogenic episodes in the region. This is part of the Pemberton Volcanic Belt, an eroded volcanic belt that formed as a result of subduction of the Farallon Plate starting 29 million years ago. 

During the Pleistocene period dating back over two million years ago, glaciation advancing and retreating repeatedly scoured the landscape leaving deposits of rock debris. The "U"-shaped cross section of the river valleys are a result of recent glaciation. Uplift and faulting in combination with glaciation have been the dominant processes which have created the tall peaks and deep valleys of the North Cascades area.

The North Cascades features some of the most rugged topography in the Cascade Range with craggy peaks and ridges, deep glacial valleys, and granite spires. Geological events occurring many years ago created the diverse topography and drastic elevation changes over the Cascade Range leading to various climate differences which lead to vegetation variety defining the ecoregions in this area.

Climate

Based on the Köppen climate classification, Silvertip is located in the marine west coast climate zone of western North America. Most weather fronts originate in the Pacific Ocean, and travel east toward the Cascade Range where they are forced upward by the range (Orographic lift), causing them to drop their moisture in the form of rain or snowfall. As a result, the Cascade Mountains experience high precipitation, especially during the winter months in the form of snowfall. Winter temperatures can drop below −20 °C with wind chill factors below −30 °C. The months July through September offer the most favorable weather for climbing Silvertip.

See also

 Geography of the North Cascades
 List of Ultras of North America

References

External links
 Silvertip Mountain Weather: Mountain Forecast
 "Silvertip Mountain, British Columbia" on Peakbagger

Two-thousanders of British Columbia
Canadian Cascades
Cascade Range
North Cascades
Yale Division Yale Land District